Zhujë is a village in Kamenica, Kosovo. All of its 42 inhabitants are Albanian.

Notable people
Sejdo Bajramović, acting president of Yugoslavia for a brief period in 1991

Notes and references
Notes:

References:

Villages in Kamenica, Kosovo